City of Glass (玻璃之城) is a 1998 Hong Kong romance film written and directed by Mabel Cheung and starring Leon Lai, Shu Qi, Nicola Cheung and Daniel Wu.

Summary
On New Year's Day 1997, a car accident in London, England claims the lives of Raphael (Leon Lai) and Vivien (Shu Qi). The couple was once young lovers during their days at the University of Hong Kong in the 1970s, but had drifted apart and eventually ended up marrying other people and raising their own families.  However, they reunited in the 1990s and their love partially rekindled. After their funeral, Raphael's son, David (Daniel Wu), and Vivien's daughter, Susie (Nicola Cheung), learned of their parents' affair and embark on a journey to discover their secret lives. In the end, the two fall in love.

Cast
 Leon Lai as Raphael Hui Kong-sun
 Shu Qi as Mrs. Vivien Hung
 Nicola Cheung as Susie Hung
 Daniel Wu as David Hui
 Vincent Kok as Derek
 Pauline Yam as Raphael's wife
 Eason Chan as Hung Ping-ching
 Elaine Jin as Vivien's mom (special appearance)
 Joe Cheung as Raphael's dad (special appearance)
 Henry Fong as Vivien's dad
 Chan Ka-hung as Taxi driver #1
 Jimmy Wong as Taxi driver #2
 Benny Tse as Taxi driver #3
 Wong Sze-yan as Flat buyer
 Hung Yip as Flate buyer's wife
 Tong Man-yee as Tiger Singh
 Laura Clarke as Marliane Griffith
 Richard Hampton as London detective
 Muk Sing as Leader of students' protest in '70s
 Poon Wai-ka as Student of the '70s
 An Mei-tik as Student of the '70s
 Wong Fat as Student of the '70s
 Tam Tik-si as Student of the '70s
 Leung Suk-chin as Student of the '70s
 Mak Nga-ka as Student of the '70s
 Chang Yat-man as Student of the '70s
 Man Wai-ling as Student of the '70s
 Yu Hoi-man as Student of the '70s
 Chan Kit-chi as Student of the '70s
 Ngai Hoi-yin as Student of the '70s
 Poon Man-wai as Student of the '70s
 Yip Tin-pui as Student of the '70s
 Leung Sin-hang as Student of the '70s
 Chan Chun-shing as Student of the '70s
 Leung Kwok-po as Student of the '70s
 Yan Shui-tong as Student of the '70s
 Luk Yuk-wai as Student of the '70s
 Cheung Wing-hang as Student of the '70s
 Cheung Sau-wai as Student of the '70s
 Ng Wai-san as Student of the '70s
 Cheung Hok-ming as Student of the '70s
 Ben Cheung as Student of the '70s
 Szeto Chi-kit as Student of the '70s
 Tang Wing-san as Uncle Henry
 Chow Ka-lai as Veterinarian
 Fong Jing-to as Member of band
 Poon Pau-lok as Member of band
 Leung Kam-biu as Member of band
 Carthy Rosslyn as Warden of Lady Hall
 Chui Wing-suen as Dr. Bernadette Tsui
 Hung Man-ling as Student of the '90s
 Lam Yuk-jan as Student of the '90s
 Lam Siu-bing as Student of the '90s
 Luk Yan as Student of the '90s
 Yeung Lam as Student of the '90s
 Cheung Pui-san as Student of the '90s
 Yeung Yat-man as Student of the '90s
 Lee Pui-ling as Student of the '90s
 Cheung Yuet-fan as Student of the '90s
 Chan Ka-ying as Student of the '90s
 Yiu Koon-tung as Student of the '90s
 Lee Hon-wai as Student of the '90s
 Chan Chui-hung as Student of the '90s
 Wong Yan-wing as Student of the '90s
 Chan Man-ho as Student of the '90s
 Ng Shiu-wa as Student of the '90s
 Lee Hon-ban as Student of the '90s
 Chan Cheuk-wing as Student of the '90s
 Chiu Kin-tong as Student of the '90s
 Yau Wai-hung as Student of the '90s
 Leung Wing-ban as Chinese language teacher 
 Paul Cliff as Pilot trainer
 Hogan Ho as Pilot trainer
 Charles Montgomery as Pilot trainer
 Sam Pau-man as Paul
 Paul Harrington as Riot Central Officer
 Craig Leeson as Riot Central Officer
 Verner Dickley as Judge
 David Rosslyn as Professor

Reception
The film was deemed a modest commercial success, grossing HK$9 million in its 1998 Hong Kong theatrical release.  Critical commentary perceived the film as a metaphorical comment on the end of British rule in Hong Kong after the handover to Chinese sovereignty in 1997.

Awards and nominations

References

External links
 
 HK Cinemagic entry

1998 films
1990s romance films
Hong Kong romance films
1990s Cantonese-language films
Golden Harvest films
Films set in 1997
Films set in the 1970s
Films set in London
Films shot in London
Films directed by Mabel Cheung
1990s Hong Kong films